Tinderet Constituency is an electoral constituency in Kenya. It is one of six constituencies of Nandi County (formerly Nandi District). The constituency was established for the 1966 elections. It has recently been delimited to create two new constituencies after the parliamentary approval, the newly created constituencies are Tinderet and Nandi Hills.

Members of Parliament

Wards

References 

Constituencies in Nandi County
Constituencies in Rift Valley Province
1966 establishments in Kenya
Constituencies established in 1966